Georget Bertoncello (3 September 1943 – 22 December 2019) was a Belgian footballer who played as a striker.

References

1943 births
2019 deaths
R. Charleroi S.C. players
RFC Liège players
Union Royale Namur Fosses-La-Ville players
Belgian footballers
Association football forwards